
Gmina Grodzisk is a rural gmina (administrative district) in Siemiatycze County, Podlaskie Voivodeship, in north-eastern Poland.

Villages
Gmina Grodzisk contains the villages and settlements of: 
 
 Aleksandrowo
 Biszewo
 Bogusze-Litewka
 Czaje
 Czarna Cerkiewna
 Czarna Średnia
 Czarna Wielka
 Dobrogoszcz
 Dołubowo-Wyręby
 Drochlin
 Grodzisk
 Jaszczołty
 Kamianki
 Koryciny
 Kosianka Leśna
 Kosianka-Boruty
 Kosianka-Trojanówka
 Krakówki-Dąbki
 Krakówki-Włodki
 Krakówki-Zdzichy
 Krynki Borowe
 Krynki-Białokunki
 Krynki-Jarki
 Krynki-Miklasy
 Krynki-Sobole
 Lubowicze
 Makarki
 Małyszczyn
 Mierzynówka
 Morze
 Niewiarowo-Przybki
 Niewiarowo-Sochy
 Nowe Sypnie
 Porzeziny-Giętki
 Porzeziny-Mendle
 Rybałty
 Siemiony
 Stadniki
 Stara Kosianka
 Stare Bogusze
 Stare Sypnie
 Targowisk
 Żale
 Żery Bystre
 Żery-Czubiki and Żery-Pilaki

Neighbouring gminas
Gmina Grodzisk is bordered by the gminas of Brańsk, Ciechanowiec, Drohiczyn, Dziadkowice, Perlejewo, Rudka and Siemiatycze.

References
Polish official population figures 2006

Grodzisk
Siemiatycze County